Ivanovo is a rural locality (a selo) and the administrative center of Ivanovskoye Rural Settlement, Kovrovsky District, Vladimir Oblast, Russia. The population was 1,808 as of 2010. There are 16 streets.

Geography 
Ivanovo is located 32 km south of Kovrov (the district's administrative centre) by road. Pavlovskoye is the nearest rural locality.

References 

Rural localities in Kovrovsky District